Rainbow Road is the debut studio album from Japanese singer and voice actress Haruka Tomatsu, released on 24 February 2010. It consists of nearly all the songs from her previous anime theme singles, 8 in all, plus 6 new songs. Two editions of the album were released: a standard version containing the music CD, and a special edition containing the CD as well as a DVD with bonus video clips.

Track listing

Bonus content

DVD edition
"Naissance" Music Clip
"Motto Hade Ni Ne!" Music Clip
"Musuhi No Toki" Music Clip
"Koi no Uta" Music Clip
"Girls, Be Ambitious." Music Clip
Road to Rainbow Road
ウラ★naissance

External links
 Haruka Tomatsu official discography 

2010 debut albums
Haruka Tomatsu albums